Fugitives for a Night is a 1938 American Mystery film directed by Leslie Goodwins and written by Dalton Trumbo. The film stars Frank Albertson, Eleanor Lynn, Allan Lane, Bradley Page and Adrienne Ames. The film was released on September 23, 1938, by RKO Pictures.

Plot
A Hollywood actor is accused of murder and attempts to scheme his way out of it.

Cast 
Frank Albertson as Matt Ryan
Eleanor Lynn as Ann Wray
Allan Lane as John Nelson
Bradley Page as Dennis Poole
Adrienne Ames as Eileen Baker 
Jonathan Hale as Police Captain
Russell Hicks as Maurice Tenwright
Paul Guilfoyle as Monks
Robert Gleckler as J. G. McGee

References

External links 
 

1938 films
1938 mystery films
American mystery films
American black-and-white films
RKO Pictures films
Films directed by Leslie Goodwins
Films with screenplays by Dalton Trumbo
1930s English-language films
1930s American films